Neotridactylus archboldi, the Archbold pygmy mole cricket, or scrub pygmy mole cricket, is a species of pygmy mole cricket in the family Tridactylidae. It is endemic to Florida, where it is found in Florida scrub on the Lake Wales Ridge.

References

Tridactylidae
Articles created by Qbugbot
Insects described in 1996